Sam Dolgoff (10 October 1902 – 15 October 1990) was an anarchist and anarcho-syndicalist from Russia who grew up and lived and was active in the United States.

Biography 
Dolgoff was born in the shtetl of Ostrovno in Mogilev Governorate, Russian Empire (in present-day Beshankovichy Raion, Belarus), moving as a child to New York City in 1905 or 1906, where he lived in the Bronx and in Manhattan's Lower East Side where he died. His father was a house painter, and Dolgoff began house painting at the age of 11, a profession he remained in his entire life.

After being expelled from the Young People's Socialist League, Sam joined the Industrial Workers of the World in 1922 and remained an active member his entire life, playing an active role in the anarchist movement for much of the century. He was a co-founder of the Libertarian Labor Review magazine, which was later renamed Anarcho-Syndicalist Review to avoid confusion with America's Libertarian Party.

Dolgoff was a member of the Chicago Free Society Group in the 1920s, Vanguard Group member and editor of its publication Vanguard: A Journal of Libertarian Communism in the 1930s, and co-founded the Libertarian League in New York in 1954. He wrote articles for anarchist magazines as well as books as the editor of anthologies, some of which are listed below. He was active in many causes, and attended groups like New York's Libertarian Book Club regularly.

Dogloff died of congestive heart failure at the age of 88 in 1990.

Selected bibliography 
 Ethics and American Unionism (1958)
 The Labor Party Illusion (1961)
 Bakunin on Anarchy (1971; revised 1980)
 The Anarchist Collectives: Workers' Self-Management in the Spanish Revolution, 1936–1939 (1974)
 The Cuban Revolution: A Critical Perspective (1974)
 "American Labor Movement: Rebellion in the Ranks" Interrogations No. 3, 1975.
 The Relevance of Anarchism to Modern Society (1977)
 A Critique of Marxism (1983)
 "Modern Technology and Anarchism" (1986)
 Fragments: A Memoir (1986).
 Third World Nationalism and the State (Anarchist Communist Federation of North America) (1983)

See also 
 Anarchism in the United States

References

Sources 
 
 
 
  (PDF)
 
 
 
 
 
 
 
 
  (PDF)

External links 
 Papers, 1874–1991 (bulk 1937–1977) at the New York University Wagner Archives
 Sam Dolgoff, Collected Works and Info on RevoltLib.com
 An obituary and short biography of Sam Dolgoff on libcom.org

1902 births
1990 deaths
20th-century American historians
American male non-fiction writers
20th-century Russian historians
American anarchists
American anti-capitalists
American people of Belarusian-Jewish descent
Anarcho-syndicalists
Belarusian Jews
Historians of anarchism
House painters
Emigrants from the Russian Empire to the United States
Jews from the Russian Empire
Industrial Workers of the World members
Jewish anarchists
People from Beshankovichy District
People from Sennensky Uyezd
Russian anti-capitalists
20th-century American male writers